Ray Kendrick is an Australian multihull sailboat designer. He works with partner Fran Sneesby as Team Scarab. Previously, he worked under the Kendrick Designs entity.

Designs
 Aussie
 Avalon 8.2
 Avalon 9
 Scarab 8
 Scarab 16
 Scarab 18
 Scarab 22
 Scarab 32
 Scarab 350
 Scarab 650
 Scarab 670

References

External links
Team Scarab
Yendys Boats

Year of birth missing
Multihull designers